Hernialde is a town located in the province of Gipuzkoa, in the autonomous community of Basque Country, northern Spain.

References

External links
 Official Website Information available in Spanish and Basque.
 HERNIALDE in the Bernardo Estornés Lasa - Auñamendi Encyclopedia (Euskomedia Fundazioa) Information available in Spanish

Municipalities in Gipuzkoa